The 1932 Isle of Man Tourist Trophy race meeting was watched by Prince George, Duke of Kent the first royal visitor to the Isle of Man TT Races. Also on the first lap Wal Handley riding for Rudge crashed at the 11th Milestone sustaining a back injury and retired. The place on the TT Course where the incident occurred was renamed Handley's Corner.

Senior TT (500cc)

Junior TT (350cc)

Lightweight TT (250cc)

Notes
 During practice, Jimmie Guthrie riding a Norton motor-cycle strikes a sheep at Glen Duff Quarry.

Sources

External links
 Detailed race results
 Isle of Man TT winners
 Mountain Course map

Isle of Man TT
1932
Isle